John Ralph Beaumont DL, JP (22 April 1927 – November 1992) was a Rhodesian politician. He was the son of Ralph Edward Blackett Beaumont, son of Wentworth Beaumont, 1st Viscount Allendale, and his wife Helena Mary Christine Wray, daughter of Cecil Wray.

Education
He was educated at Eton College and then Christ Church, Oxford, where he graduated with a Master of Arts in 1952.

Career
In the 1962 Federation of Rhodesia and Nyasaland election, Beaumont was elected for Mrewa, sitting for the constituency until the federation's dissolution in the following year.

He became a Justice of the Peace of Powys in 1976 and represented the county as Deputy Lieutenant from 1983.

Residence
In  his later years he lived in the family home at Plas Llwyngwern, near Machynlleth.

Family
On 26 June 1951, he married Audrey Lilian Christine Hickling, daughter of Edward Thomas Hickling, and had by her six children, five sons and one daughter.:

 Ralph Wentworth Christopher Beaumont b. 4 Apr 1952
 Nigel Canning Vane Beaumont b. 8 Jan 1954
 Andrew John Blackett Beaumont b. 27 Mar 1956
 Louise Christine Winsmore Beaumont b. 27 Mar 1956
 Hugh Edward Stewart Beaumont b. 25 Mar 1959
 Peter John Tempest Beaumont b. 29 Dec 1964

Death
Beaumont died, aged 65 in Wales.

References

1927 births
1992 deaths
Zimbabwean people of British descent
Zimbabwean exiles
Alumni of Christ Church, Oxford
Deputy Lieutenants of Powys
People educated at Eton College
Rhodesian politicians